Shruti Naik is an Indian American scientist who is an Assistant Professor of Biological Sciences at the NYU Langone Medical Center.  In 2020 Naik was named a Packard Fellow for her research into the molecular mechanisms that underpin the function of tissue stem cells. She was awarded the 2018 regional Blavatnik Awards for Young Scientists and the International Takeda Innovator in Regeneration Award. She has also received the NIH Directors Innovator Award and been named a Pew Stewart Scholar in 2020.

Early life and education 
Naik was born in India and moved to America at the age of twelve. Naik dealt with the culture shock through humour, and made her way through high school as a stand-up comedian. Whilst a high school student Naik came across the story of Dr. Bonnie Bassler, a biologist at Princeton University, who was working on glowing bacteria. After watching Bassler on television, Naik decided she wanted to become a biologist, and took classes in microbiology at high school. She was an undergraduate student at the University of Maryland, College Park, where she majored in cell and molecular biology. As an undergraduate Naik worked in the Food and Drug Administration laboratory on campus. After graduating, Naik was appointed to the Naval Medical Research Center, where she looked at immune responses to traumatic brain injury. Naik completed her doctoral research at the University of Pennsylvania under the supervision of Yasmine Belkaid. She was a postdoctoral fellow at Rockefeller University.

Research and career 
Naik studies the interactions between immune cells and microbes in biological tissue. In particular, Naik is interested in the tissues that interface with various organs, including the skin, lungs and gut. She has investigated inflammation and tissue regeneration, host-microbe interactions and immunity. Her research on skin stem cells was the first to identify how the skin remembers injuries and exposure to irritants, showing that the long-lived epithelial stem cells in the skin have a memory to inflammatory stimuli. Repeated exposure can change the genetic landscape of stem cells, making them quicker to respond when they next encounter an attack. This response can be beneficial, such as allowing for faster healing of wounds, or they can be damaging, such as allowing for inflammatory skin diseases such as psoriasis. Naik was made a Packard Fellow in 2020.

Awards and honours 
 2015 Regeneron Pharmaceuticals Regeneron Prize for Creative Innovation
 2016 L'Oréal-UNESCO For Women in Science Award
 2017 Sartorius Prize winners
 2018 Blavatnik Awards for Young Scientists
 2018 Nature Research Awards Finalist
 2018 Damon Runyon Dale F. Frey Award for Breakthrough Scientists
 2018 Tri-Institution Breakout Award
 2019 Takeda Awards Innovators in Science Award Early Career Winner
 2020 Packard Fellow
2020 Pew Stewart Fellow 
 2020 NIH DP2 Innovator Award NIH DP2 Award

Selected publications

References 

{{|url=https://commonfund.nih.gov/newinnovator/awardrecipients}}

American people of Indian descent in health professions
New York University faculty
New York University Grossman School of Medicine faculty
Princeton University alumni
Year of birth missing (living people)
Living people
American women biologists
American women academics
21st-century American women